This is an extended version of the energy density table from the main Energy density page:

Notes

Energy storage